Roberto Miguel Acuña Cabello (born 25 March 1972) is a Paraguayan former footballer.

Nicknamed El Toro (bull) due to his strength and dominating presence, he operated mainly as a central midfielder. He spent several years as a professional in Spain at Zaragoza and Deportivo, appearing rarely for the latter club.

Acuña played 100 times for Paraguay, representing the nation in three World Cups and four Copa América tournaments.

Club career
Acuña was born in Avellaneda, Buenos Aires, Argentina, emigrating to Paraguay (his father's origin country) at a young age and starting playing for Club Nacional in 1989. After five years, he decided to acquire the country's citizenship to play for the national team, eventually becoming the second most capped player in Paraguay's history, second only to Carlos Gamarra.

Afterwards, Acuña played four seasons back in Argentina, with Argentinos Juniors, Club Atlético Independiente and Boca Juniors, before moving to Europe in 1997 where he signed with Spain's Real Zaragoza. With the Aragonese he was an everpresent midfield fixture, helping the side to the 2001 conquest of the Copa del Rey. In 2001, he won the Paraguayan Footballer of the Year award.

Consequently, Acuña attracted attention from Deportivo de La Coruña, which bought the player for five years and €11 million even though he was still due a five-match suspension from the previous season, where Zaragoza was relegated. With the Galicians, however, he never appeared more than seven times in the league during his spell, also struggling with injuries and being often loaned.

Acuña first retired in 2007, finishing his career in Paraguay with Olimpia Asunción. However, in 2009, he came out of inactivity, signing with lowly Club Rubio Ñu; in 2012, the 40-year-old joined Club 12 de Octubre.

In 2015, aged 43, Acuña helped Deportivo Recoleta gain promotion to the Paraguayan Primera División B. In December of that year, he re-joined former club Rubio Ñu.

International career
Like central defender Gamarra, Acuña appeared in three FIFA World Cup – 1998, 2002 and 2006 – and collected 100 caps in total, scoring five goals. He played all the matches for the national team in all three editions, and was the first Paraguayan to be sent off in a World Cup when he elbowed Germany's Michael Ballack in the last minute of the 0–1 round-of-16 loss on 15 June 2002 (for a second bookable offense).

In the build-up to the 2006 World Cup, Acuña made headlines in Sweden after reportedly having asked a FIFA employee to phone and try to arrange a date with a female photographer. He retired from international competition on 11 June 2011 at the age of 39, captaining Paraguay in a friendly with Romania.

Acuña also represented the nation in the beach soccer variety.

International goals
Scores and results list Paraguay's goal tally first.

Honours

Club
Independiente
Supercopa Sudamericana: 1995

Zaragoza
Copa del Rey: 2000–01

Individual
Paraguayan Footballer of the Year: 2001

See also
 List of men's footballers with 100 or more international caps
 Players and Records in Paraguayan Football

References

External links
 Argentine League statistics at Fútbol XXI 
 
 
 
 
 Football-Lineups profile

1972 births
Living people
Argentine sportspeople of Paraguayan descent
Argentine emigrants to Paraguay
Citizens of Paraguay through descent
Sportspeople from Avellaneda
Argentine footballers
Paraguayan footballers
Association football midfielders
Paraguayan Primera División players
Club Nacional footballers
Club Olimpia footballers
12 de Octubre Football Club players
Club Rubio Ñu footballers
Argentine Primera División players
Argentinos Juniors footballers
Boca Juniors footballers
Club Atlético Independiente footballers
Rosario Central footballers
La Liga players
Segunda División players
Real Zaragoza players
Deportivo de La Coruña players
Elche CF players
UAE Pro League players
Al Ain FC players
Paraguay international footballers
1998 FIFA World Cup players
2002 FIFA World Cup players
2006 FIFA World Cup players
1993 Copa América players
1995 Copa América players
1997 Copa América players
1999 Copa América players
Argentine expatriate footballers
Paraguayan expatriate footballers
Expatriate footballers in Spain
Expatriate footballers in the United Arab Emirates
Paraguayan expatriate sportspeople in Spain
Argentine expatriate sportspeople in the United Arab Emirates
FIFA Century Club
Beach soccer players